The 2014–15 season was Ludogorets Razgrad's fourth season in A Football Group. They successfully defended their title, winning the championship for a fourth consecutive and overall time. Also, Ludogorets Razgrad reached the semi-finals in the Bulgarian Cup, won the SuperCup and, most notably, made their maiden appearance in the UEFA Champions League group stage, winning the play-off round against Steaua București in dramatic fashion. Ludogorets won €14,547,000 in prize money for their participation in Europe.

Squad

Out on loan

Transfers

Summer

In:

Out:

Winter

In:

Out:

Competitions

Bulgarian Supercup

A Football Group

First phase

League table

Results summary

Results by round

Results

Championship group

League table

Results summary

Results by round

Results

Bulgarian Cup

Champions League

Qualifying phase

Group stage

Squad statistics

Appearances and goals

|-
|colspan="14"|Players away from the club on loan:

|-
|colspan="14"|Players who appeared for Ludogorets Razgrad that left during the season:

|}

Goal Scorers

Disciplinary Record

Notes

References

Ludogorets Razgrad
PFC Ludogorets Razgrad seasons
Ludogorets Razgrad
Bulgarian football championship-winning seasons